Don Henderson (13 July 1930 – 2 January 1999) was  a former Australian rules footballer who played with Footscray in the Victorian Football League (VFL).

Notes

External links 
		

1930 births
1999 deaths
Australian rules footballers from Victoria (Australia)
Western Bulldogs players